Alfred Michel Thurier (January 11, 1916 in Ste-Anne-de-Stukely near Granby, Quebec – November 20, 1999 in Vero Beach, Florida) was a Canadian professional ice hockey centre. He played 80 games in the National Hockey League for the New York Americans/Brooklyn Americans and New York Rangers between 1940 and 1945. The rest of his career, which lasted from 1940 to 1952, was mainly spent in the minor American Hockey League.

Playing career
Thurier played parts of three seasons with the New York Americans and Rangers during the 1940s. He was best known for his offensive output in the AHL. He led the AHL in scoring with the Springfield Indians during the 1940–41 season. For the 1942–43 and 1943–44 seasons Thurier was with the Canadian Army as part of the Second World War, and played on military teams in Montreal. He returned to the AHL after the war ended, and helped the Cleveland Barons to Calder Cup victories in 1948 and 1951. In 80 NHL games, Thurier recorded 25 goals and 27 assists for 52 points.

Career statistics

Regular season and playoffs

Achievements and awards
AHL First All-Star Team (1941)
AHL Second All-Star Team (1942, 1951)
AHL Hall of Fame (2020)

References

External links

1916 births
1999 deaths
Brooklyn Americans players
Buffalo Bisons (AHL) players
Canadian ice hockey centres
Canadian military personnel of World War II
Cleveland Barons (1937–1973) players
Ice hockey people from Quebec
New York Americans players
New York Rangers players
People from Granby, Quebec
Springfield Indians players